The 11465 / 11466 Somnath–Jabalpur Junction Express (via Bina) is an Express train belonging to Indian Railways that runs between  and  in India.

Service

The 11466 Jabalpur Junction–Somnath Express covers the distance of 1570 kilometres in 29 hours 15 mins (47.58 km/hr) & in 30 hours 30 mins as 11465 Somnath–Jabalpur Junction Express (47.70 km/hr).

Route & halts

The important halts of the train are:

Coach composition

The train has highly refurbished LHB rakes with max speed of 110 kmph. The train consists of 22 coaches:

 1 AC First-class
 2 AC II Tier
 4 AC III Tier
 9 Sleeper coaches
 4 General
 2 Second-class Luggage/parcel van

Traction

The train is hauled by a Sabarmati-based WDP-4D locomotive from Somnath until  after which a Tughlakabad / Itarsi-based WAP-7 (HOG)-equipped locomotive hauls the train for the remainder of its journey until Jabalpur Junction and vice versa.

Direction reversal

The train reverses its direction once at:
 
 .

Rake sharing
The train shares its rake with; 
 11463/11464 Somnath–Jabalpur Express (via Itarsi),
 22191/22192 Jabalpur–Indore Overnight Express.

Timings
 11465 Somnath–Jabalpur Junction Express leaves Somnath every Monday & Saturday at 09:55 hrs IST and reaches Jabalpur Junction at 16:25 hrs IST the next day.
 11466 Jabalpur Junction–Somnath Express leaves Jabalpur Junction every Monday & Saturday at 12:40 hrs IST and reaches Somnath at 17:55 hrs IST the next day.

See also 

 Somnath–Jabalpur Express (via Itarsi)
 Jabalpur–Indore Overnight Express
 Somnath railway station
 Jabalpur Junction railway station

Notes

References

External links

Transport in Jabalpur
Transport in Veraval
Express trains in India
Rail transport in Madhya Pradesh
Rail transport in Gujarat